Christy A. Lemire (née Nemetz; born August 30, 1972) is an American film critic and host of the movie review podcast Breakfast All Day. She previously wrote for the Associated Press from 1999 to 2013, was a co-host of Ebert Presents at the Movies in 2011 and co-hosted the weekly online movie review show What The Flick?! until 2018.

Early life and education 
Born at the old Cedars of Lebanon Hospital (now Church of Scientology West Coast headquarters), Lemire grew up in Woodland Hills. She is a 1993 graduate of Southern Methodist University with a degree in journalism and is a member of the Delta Gamma sorority.

Career
Lemire started writing film reviews for the Associated Press in 1999 and moved to New York in 2000 as a general entertainment reporter. In 2004, she became the Associated Press' first full-time film critic. In addition to her print work, Lemire has appeared on television shows including the Today Show and Good Morning America.

In 2003, she was a guest co-host on The View. Lemire made headlines when she and co-host Meredith Vieira shared a kiss in response to the Madonna and Britney Spears kiss at the MTV Video Music Awards.

Lemire was ranked number 93 on the "Independent Critics List of the 100 Most Beautiful Faces of 2008".

Lemire made several appearances substituting for film critic Roger Ebert on At the Movies. When Ebert created his new film review program for public television, Ebert Presents: At The Movies, Lemire was selected as co-host of the program along with film critic Ignatiy Vishnevetsky. Ebert Presents: at the Movies aired for a single season in 2011.

She was one of the regular critics on the YouTube show What The Flick?! hosted on The Young Turks network, from 2010 to 2018. In August 2018, The Young Turks network canceled What The Flick?!  along with Pop Trigger and Nerd Alert to focus on news content. Lemire and co-host Alonso Duralde, former hosts Ben Mankiewicz and Matt Atchity continued the series as a podcast on Lemire's personal website under the new name, Breakfast All Day.

Preferences

Best films of the year 
2010: The Social Network
2011: Martha Marcy May Marlene
2012: Argo
2013: Gravity 
2014: Birdman
2015: Mad Max: Fury Road
2016: La La Land
2017: Call Me by Your Name
2018: The Favourite
2019: Parasite
2020: American Utopia
2021: Licorice Pizza
2022: The Banshees of Inisherin

Personal life
She lives in Palos Verdes Estates, California with her husband Chris Lemire, a television producer, and son Nicolas, born in November 2009. She has described herself as a "lapsed Catholic".

Filmography

References

External links

1972 births
20th-century American journalists
20th-century American non-fiction writers
20th-century American women writers
21st-century American journalists
21st-century American non-fiction writers
21st-century American women writers
Associated Press reporters
American film critics
American women podcasters
American podcasters
Catholics from California
Living people
Southern Methodist University alumni
Television personalities from California
The Young Turks people
American women film critics
Writers from Los Angeles
People from Palos Verdes Estates, California